Sukanya is an Indian Bharatnatyam dancer,  actress, music composer and voice actor. She has acted in Tamil films in addition to some Malayalam, Kannada and Telugu films.

She started her acting career in 1991. She was one the lead Tamil actresses from 1991 to 1998. She travels widely giving  dance performances. She has also composed two devotional albums namely Azhagu and Thirupathi Thirukudai Thiruvizha.

Filmography

Tamil

Malayalam

Telugu

Kannada

Singer

As dubbing artist
 2002 - Kannathil Muthamittal (for Nandita Das) - Tamil film

Television

References

External links
 

Place of birth missing (living people)
Indian voice actresses
Living people
Actresses in Malayalam cinema
Actresses in Tamil cinema
Tamil Nadu State Film Awards winners
Filmfare Awards South winners
Actresses in Kannada cinema
Actresses in Telugu cinema
20th-century Indian actresses
Indian film actresses
21st-century Indian actresses
Actresses from Chennai
Indian television actresses
Actresses in Tamil television
Actresses in Malayalam television
1970 births